Defending champion Andy Murray defeated Milos Raonic in the final, 6–7(5–7), 6–4, 6–3 to win the singles tennis title at the 2016 Queen's Club Championships. It was his record fifth Queen's title. This would be the first of two consecutive finals on grass between Murray and Raonic, as the two met again in the final of Wimbledon three weeks later, with Murray again prevailing to win his second Wimbledon and third major title.

Seeds

Draw

Finals

Top half

Bottom half

Qualifying

Seeds

Qualifiers

Lucky losers
  Jiří Veselý

Qualifying draw

First qualifier

Second qualifier

Third qualifier

Fourth qualifier

References

Main Draw
Qualifying Draw

Singles
Queen's Club Championships - Singles